George Noel Gittoes,  (born 7 December 1949) is an Australian artist, film producer, director and writer.  In 1970, he was a founder of the Yellow House Artist Collective in Sydney.  After the Yellow House finished, he established himself in Bundeena and since then has produced a large and varied output of drawings, paintings, films, and writings.  Gittoes’ work has consistently expressed his social, political and humanitarian concern at the effects of injustice and conflict.  Until the mid-1980s, this work was chiefly done in Australia.  But in 1986 he travelled to Nicaragua, and since then the focus of Gittoes’ work has been largely international.  He has travelled to and worked in many regions of conflict, including the Philippines, Somalia, Cambodia, Rwanda, Bosnia, Bougainville, and South Africa.  In recent years his work has especially centred on the Middle East, with repeated visits to Israel and Palestine, Iraq, and Afghanistan.  In 2011, he established a new Yellow House, a multidisciplinary arts centre in Jalalabad, Afghanistan.  Among many prizes, Gittoes has twice been awarded the Blake Prize for Religious Art.

Early life
Gittoes was born 1949 in Brighton-le-Sands, New South Wales and grew up in nearby Rockdale, New South Wales, both southern suburbs of Sydney, Australia. Gittoes’ maternal grandfather, who lived in the area, was a semi-professional racehorse trainer, and was a significant influence in Gittoes’ childhood.  Gittoes' father, Claude, was a public servant, who rose to be Secretary of the Department of Main Roads.  His mother, Joyce, was an artist and potter.  Both parents encouraged George as an artist.
Gittoes completed his schooling at Kingsgrove North High School, and began an Arts degree at Sydney University.  However, an encounter with the visiting American art critic Clement Greenberg led to Gittoes' abandoning his studies in order to spend time in America. Both parents supported this decision, particularly his father.  In New York Gittoes came under the influence of the social realist artist, Joe Delaney, whose work was influenced by his involvement in the civil rights movement.  Gittoes’ art similarly veered towards the political, and in the US he began the Hotel Kennedy Suite, inspired by opposition to the Vietnam War.

Work in Australia, 1970–1985

Returning to Australia in late 1969, a meeting with Martin Sharp led to the establishment of the Yellow House Artist Collective near Kings Cross, New South Wales.  Gittoes worked with another friend, Bruce Goold, to transform a two-storey building in Macleay Street, Potts Point, into a space in which artists, film-makers and performers could both live and exhibit their work.  In an Australia whose culture had been seen by many as stifled and colonial, the Yellow House was a revelation.  Gittoes’ own particular contribution was a psychedelic Puppet Theatre, in which he and assistants performed to enthusiastic audiences, using glove puppets Gittoes himself made.  In 1971 Gittoes, who regarded his work as fine art and was not completely in sympathy with the counter-cultural communalism of others in the Yellow House, broke away from the group.  He had also been very deeply affected by the suicide of his girlfriend, Marie Briebauer.  He had met Briebauer in San Francisco, and eventually she followed him to Sydney.  But she was facing up to difficult issues with her family, and was not completely accepted by the Yellow House community.  Her death was the first great crisis in Gittoes’ life.

A keen surfer, Gittoes travelled for a while in a caravan up and down the south coast of NSW.  Eventually he settled in Bundeena, a village between sea and bush south of Sydney.  For a time abandoning the politically driven art inspired by Joe Delaney, Gittoes produced a large series of photographs, drawings and paintings, eventually leading to a film, The Rainbow Way..  These images were abstract, using ideas drawn from both Islamic and Aboriginal art (in the latter case, especially the myth of the Rainbow Serpent), but also created out of direct observation of the effects of light underwater.  He also experimented for a time with holograms and with computer-generated images.  His interest in Aboriginal art and performance, which began with meeting dancers from Mornington Island in 1972, led in 1977 to a trip to the Northern Territory and Western Australia.

Gittoes was keen to bring art and performance to a wide audience.  In 1979 he formed the environmental theatre group, Theatre Reaching Environments Everywhere (TREE), with Gabrielle Dalton (whom he married in 1980), Ronaldo Cameron, and Martin Wesley-Smith.  Between 1979 and 1984 TREE presented a number of huge theatrical events, mostly on beaches around Sydney, involving hundreds of local people.  Gavin Fry has described these as “some of the most complete and spectacular art performances Australia has seen”.

In partnership with Dalton, Gittoes now turned especially to documentary film-making, first with Tracks of the Rainbow (1984), a film about Aboriginal children visiting sites of importance to the story of the Rainbow Serpent.  Then there were a series of films about life, cultural confrontation, and art in the Northern Territory: Warriors and lawmen (1985), Frontier women (1985), Unbroken spirit (1985), and Visions in the making.

Australia and overseas, 1986–1992
In 1986, the success of the Northern Territory films led Gittoes overseas, to make Bullets of the poets (1987), a film about a group of Sandinista women poets who had fought in the Nicaraguan revolution.  This was a turning point for Gittoes.  He was influenced by Nicaraguan poet and priest Ernesto Cardenal, whose philosophy of Externalism he later described as follows: “The Externalist poets believed in using real life events and physical experiences in their poetry, instead of the imagery of the imagination.  For them reality was more incredible than fantasy.”   Gittoes’ key work from this period was the drawing, “The captured gun”, of a half-crippled Sandinista fighter who carried a captured American rifle adapted to use Russian ammunition, which he felt “symbolised that particular phase in the conflict ... and became a major breakthrough in my artistic career.”

In 1989 Gittoes travelled to the Philippines, intending to make a film about women political prisoners.  Funding problems prevented the film's being made, but again he was brought face to face with victims of conflict, especially between government forces and the dissident New People's Army.  The resulting works included the Salvage series, documenting the discovery of the body of a torture victim.  He also began a long friendship and collaboration with Filipino artist Nune Alvarado.  As much as Nicaragua, the Philippines helped shape Gittoes’ future work: “Through my art I can be an advocate for so many people silenced by poverty and the conflicts around them.”

After this, Gittoes worked for a time mainly in Australia, in particular on the series of paintings and drawings, Heavy Industry.  Initially in 1989 he was invited by the Wollongong Regional Gallery to be artist in residence at the Port Kembla Steelworks in NSW.  Between then and 1992 he worked in steelworks, mines, chemical plants, and a Bass Strait oil rig, in Wollongong, Newcastle, Broken Hill, Whyalla, and elsewhere, depicting the men working in these environments sympathetically against a background of industrial decline and difficult and dangerous working conditions.  In doing this, he felt he was not only holding true to the Externalist idea of art, but also returning to Joe Delaney's view of art “about a historic social struggle exuding pathos and humanity”.

In this period, Gittoes was deeply affected by the death of his friend Ronaldo Cameron, a dancer who had been part of the TREE productions.  Gittoes had painted Cameron in the advanced stages of motor neurone disease, and after his death expressed his grief with the painting, Ancient Prayer, which in 1992 won the prestigious Blake Prize for Religious Art.  In 1993 he won the Wynne Prize for landscape, for Open Cut, from the Heavy Industry series.

Peacekeeping and war, 1993–2001
From 1993, Gittoes’ career took a distinct new direction.  Building on his work in Nicaragua and the Philippines, he made a long series of visits to war zones, initially those in which Australian military personnel were serving in multinational peacekeeping operations.  Although since World War I Australia had a long tradition of employing official war artists, Gittoes was never a designated Official Artist.  Rather, he travelled under the auspices of and generally with the assistance of the Australian army, but remained free to express himself as he wished.  On these trips he produced a large body of photographs, drawings and paintings.  True to the Externalist tradition, many of the drawings incorporate written texts describing the situations which had inspired them.  Many of these works are held by the Australian War Memorial, which had helped facilitate the initial contact with the army.  One aspect of Gittoes’ work in this period which differentiates him from most Australian official artists is an enduring interest in and concern for the ways in which the conflict which led to the arrival of the peacekeepers had affected the local people.  Gittoes did document the activities of the military personnel he was accompanying, but his vision was also consistently much broader.

The first stop, in March 1993, was Somalia, where Australia had provided a battalion to the American-led Unified Task Force (UNITAF), which was trying on behalf of the United Nations (UN) to restore order to a country devastated by civil war, collapse of government, drought, and famine.  Gittoes worked in Mogadishu and in and around Baidoa, the town in south-central Somalia which was the main base of operations for the Australians.  Rather than remaining on base, he often accompanied the troops on patrol and when protecting the delivery of humanitarian aid.

Soon afterwards, in May and June 1993, Gittoes visited Australia's other major peacekeeping operation at the time, in Cambodia.  Cambodia had suffered from American bombing in the Vietnam War, the genocidal Khmer Rouge regime of 1975–1979. and long years of civil war between the Vietnam-sponsored government which had ousted the Khmer Rouge and various other factional groupings.  Australian diplomatic leadership in achieving a settlement to the conflict under the auspices of the UN meant that the resulting UN operation, the UN Transitional Authority in Cambodia (UNTAC), was led by an Australian, Lieutenant General John Sanderson.  Gittoes documented activities of Australian signallers with UNTAC and painted Sanderson's portrait, but was also moved in particular by the stoic endurance of the many Cambodian victims of landmines.

In 1994, with support from the Chief of the General Staff, Lieutenant General John Grey, Gittoes was able to visit Australian peacekeepers in Western Sahara, Egypt, Israel and Lebanon.  In Western Sahara he worked with Australian signallers who were part of the UN Mission for the Referendum in Western Sahara (MINURSO).  Gittoes next went to the Middle East.  In Egypt he visited Australian peacekeepers serving with the Multinational Force and Observers (MFO), an American-led multinational operation set up in the wake of the Camp David Accords to monitor the Egyptian–Israeli border.  In Israel and Lebanon he met Australian military observers serving with the UN Truce Supervision Organization (UNTSO).  Shortly after arriving in Israel he visited the site of the massacre of February 25, 1994, in the Palestinian town of Hebron.  What he saw made him doubt the official version that the massacre was the work of a lone gunman, reinforcing his belief in the need for the artist as independent witness and as an advocate for the innocent victims of conflict. In southern Lebanon, then under Israeli occupation, he visited Australian military observers with UNTSO monitoring the border with Israel, but was again moved by the plight of people spending their lives in a conflict zone.

Also in 1994, Gittoes travelled privately to South Africa, to witness the transition to black majority rule and the election on April 27 of Nelson Mandela as president.  Mainly working in black townships, his sympathy for black South Africans led to run ins with members of the white supremacist Afrikaner Weerstandsbeweging; on one occasion he was severely beaten up.

Gittoes’ visit to South Africa coincided with the outbreak in Rwanda of the most concentrated genocidal violence of the modern era.  In three months between 500,000 and a million Rwandans died.  The resulting UN operation, the UN Assistance Mission for Rwanda (UNAMIR), included an Australian medical contingent and associated security and support personnel.  A year after the original genocide, Gittoes visited the second rotation, once again with support from the Australian Army.  By this time the Tutsi-dominated Rwandan Patriotic Front (RPF) had won the civil war, and the violence of 1994 had ended.  Nevertheless, Gittoes was witness to a tragic epilogue to the original genocide.  Huge numbers had been displaced in the 1994 fighting.  The largest camp for internally displaced persons was at Kibeho, in south-west Rwanda.  The camp held between 80,000 and 100,000 people, many of them no doubt members of the Hutu Interahamwe, which had been central in carrying out the original genocide.  In April the Rwandan government announced that the camp would close, surrounded it with soldiers, and began causing panics by firing in the air and burning the refugees’ housing.  UNAMIR had a Zambian company at Kibeho, and on 19 April they were joined by 32 Australian medical personnel and infantry, to provide medical treatment and assistance evacuating the refugees.  Gittoes, in the country to record the activities of Australian peacekeepers, joined them the next day.  Late on April 22 the Rwandan forces began a massacre, using rifles, machine guns, RPGs, bayonets, machetes, and possibly mortars.  Next morning the Australians counted 4,000 dead, no doubt fewer than the true number.  During the massacre the Australians gave medical treatment to and evacuated as many as they could, all the while witnessing terrible scenes.  All were affected by what they saw, Gittoes as much as any.  He split his time between helping give direct assistance to individual victims and documenting what was happening.  He later flew to New York to report to the UN on what he had seen.  But Kibeho also became a powerful catalyst to his art, a subject which still haunted him and which he was still reworking 20 years later.

In 1995 Gittoes won the Blake Prize for religious art a second time, for one of several versions of The Preacher, a powerful image of a preacher trying to bring calm to the people around him – and to himself – amidst the chaos and carnage of Kibeho.  In 1997 he set up an installation of Rwanda works at documenta X in Kassel, Germany.  It included ten large confronting 3 v 1.5 m paintings, employing what Gavin Fry describes as “a violent, gut-wrenching expressionism”, to depict the depths of violence and depravity reached at Kibeho; the floor was covered in rags, clothes, and plastic containers.   In 2014 he returned yet again to the Rwanda material with a series of “synthages”, combinations of photograph, drawing and painting developed in collaboration with printer John Wesley Mannion.

Gittoes continued to travel to scenes of conflict, but no longer usually with the army.  In 1996 he went to Bosnia, where a NATO-led force was gradually restoring order and peace after the devastating Bosnian War which followed the collapse of Yugoslavia.  His work, no longer particularly concerned with the peacekeepers, now focused on the plight of refugees and ordinary people living in the midst of devastation.  The following year, 1997, he travelled to Northern Ireland at a time when the Northern Ireland peace process was just getting underway, meeting members of both the Irish Republican Army and the Protestant paramilitaries, but again focusing particularly on the lives of those caught up in the conflict.  In 1998 he went to China, working with artists at the Central Academy of Fine Arts in Beijing, but also travelling to areas of the Yangtze River affected by construction of the Three Gorges Dam, and to Tibet.  In the same year he once again worked with the Australian military, visiting members of the Australian-led Peace Monitoring Group, which was helping establish trust among Bougainvilleans in the peace process which was bringing an end to the civil war between secessionist Bougainvilleans and the Papua New Guinea government.

Gittoes had first encountered the victims of landmines in Nicaragua in 1986, and continued to meet them, in Cambodia, the Middle East and elsewhere.  “For me,” Gittoes wrote, “landmines are the most damning proof of man's inhumanity to man – while the moments spent with mine victims have given me some of the most encouraging proof of the strength of the human spirit.”  In 1999 and 2000 he travelled widely to mine-affected areas: Thailand, Cambodia, Afghanistan, Pakistan, East Timor, Congo and Rwanda, leading in  2000 to an exhibition, Minefields, in aid of victims and to support the international campaign (in which Australians  took a leading role) to ban anti-personnel mines.  As well as shows in Australia and Russia, the exhibition was displayed in the United Nations office in Geneva, in the Palais des Nations, the old headquarters building of the League of Nations.

In 2001 Gittoes made three trips to South Africa, to link up with a retrospective touring exhibition, Lives in the Balance.  He also travelled once again to Israel and Palestine, documenting the ongoing conflict over Gaza.

Art and films in the post–9/11 world, 2001–2010
Gittoes was working at home in his studio at Bundeena, on the coast south of Sydney, when the world suddenly changed on 11 September 2001.  The resulting wars and confusion in the Middle East were to provide the driving force for Gittoes’ career over the next decade and a half.  By November 2001 the United States had invaded Afghanistan and overthrown the Taliban government, beginning a decade-and-a-half of war in the country.  Gittoes had already visited Afghanistan as part of the Minefields project, and quickly became engaged in the effects of this new war on the country.  He has maintained this engagement ever since.  In early 2002 he travelled to Afghanistan for six weeks with Médecins sans Frontières, visiting refugee camps established after the invasion.  He also had a commission from the Visible Art Foundation in  Melbourne to paint three works marking the 11 September anniversary for the Republic Tower Art Space.  The works, War on Terra, were rejected – for political reasons, Gittoes believed – but later exhibited at St Paul's Cathedral, Melbourne.  Later in the year, a trip to America, where the build-up to the war in Iraq had already begun, led to a turning point in Gittoes’ career.  He had always been interested in popular culture, but now he saw a new importance in reaching the MTV and rap-music generation of younger Americans, many of whom would be fighting in the war.  This helped lead him back into film-making.

In March 2003, he visited Iraq soon before the American-led invasion which began on 19 March.  On this visit he was able to observe how Iraqi civilians were preparing for the war they knew was coming.  After the invasion he visited Iraq three times before May 2004, interviewing American soldiers and Iraqi civilians and soldiers, focusing especially on the role of music on the modern battlefield.  Although Australian troops were serving in Iraq, Gittoes had little contact with them.  Out of this came one of his most acclaimed films, Soundtrack to War, which was released in 2004 and shown on Australian TV and on MTV in the United States.  Some of Gittoes’ film was also used in Michael Moore's Fahrenheit 9/11.  As well as film, Gittoes produced a lot of art out his time in Iraq, leading to an exhibition, No exit: a Tale of Two Cities – George Gittoes in New York and Baghdad.  Two years later, in 2006, he linked up again with some of the African-American soldiers who had featured in Soundtrack to War, this time on their home turf in Miami, Florida, making a film, Rampage, about a gang-based sub-culture which some of the soldiers commented was more dangerous than Iraq.  Rampage featured in a number of film festivals, and had cinema releases in Australia, Britain and the United States.

The following year, 2007, Gittoes began an enduring phase of making films in Pakistan and Afghanistan by filming the third film in the War on Terror trilogy, Miscreants of Taliwood, in the tribal belt in Pakistan's North-West Frontier Province.  In a departure from his previous films, this one was a docudrama combining the drama and action of a Pashtun telemovie with documentary footage from the Taliban-controlled tribal belt.  Like all Gittoes’ films to this date, it was co-produced by his then wife, Gabrielle Dalton.  Gittoes formed a good relationship with local film-makers and actors (some of whom later worked with him in Afghanistan), and worked with them to direct and produce two films in Pashto, the Pashtun language: Servants and Fire.  The art he produced in Pakistan led to an exhibition, The Time: a season in Pakistan, in Sydney in 2008.  Miscreants of Taliwood was widely screened at major film festivals and on TV in 2009 and 2010.  Gittoes was not done with film-making in Pakistan, but in the meantime he  travelled to Afghanistan, Iraq and Kuwait, where he once again linked up with units of the Australian Defence Force serving in these areas.

Gittoes had by now separated from his first wife in 2007. In 2008 Gittoes moved into his Surry Hills studio with Performance Artist and Musician Hellen Rose (married October 14, 2019). In 2009 and 2010 he rented a studio in Berlin, and had a productive period working on Descendance, a series of large-scale paintings inspired by events in the Middle East, but taking up themes and ideas from Night Vision, a long, cathartic novel which he periodically wrote up and revised.  In 2010 with the aid of an international aid grant he returned to Pakistan's tribal belt to make three more Pashto films with, to help develop the Pakistan film industry.  These were three dramas: Moonlight, Starless Night and The Flood.  He was assisted now by his new partner, Hellen Rose. The State Library of NSW holds a significant collection of material related to Gittoes' work in Australia and overseas including artists diaries.

Work in Afghanistan, 2011–2015
While maintaining a base in Sydney with partner Hellen Rose, in 2011 Gittoes and Rose began a long period working in Jalalabad, the second-largest city in Afghanistan.  Jalalabad, in far eastern Afghanistan, has a predominantly Pashtun population, similar to the areas where Gittoes had been working across the Pakistan border.  Here Gittoes and Rose set up a new Yellow House – the Yellow House Jalalabad – to be a centre of production and education in art, film-making, music, dance and performance.  Inspired like the original Yellow House of 1970–71 as an artists’ cooperative which can use culture to counteract the prevailing landscape of war and conflict, the new Yellow House has as a slogan, “Declare love on war!!!!”, and aims to provide “a safe space where artists from all mediums meet, work and create independently of the destructive forces that not only threatens their physical lives but their inner spirit.”  It also provides “a ‘safe haven’ for women's arts and philosophy groups.”  The Yellow House features a cinema, traveling tent circus, rainbow painting studios, Secret Garden Cafe and Rose Theatre outdoor stages.  As well as activities in the House itself, the members have organized a travelling tent circus, film shows and other activities in villages in the area.

Working with Hellen Rose ( the first European woman to appear in Pashtun Films) but otherwise with an entirely Afghan and Pashtun cast and crew, in 2011 Gittoes made a trilogy of interconnected Pashto love films: Love City, Talk Show, and The Tailor's Story.  The following year he and his collaborators set up Buraq Films, based at the Yellow House, to produce high-quality films in Pashto.  These have included the children's film, Simorgh, directed by Neha, the first female Pashtun film-director.  Another member of the Yellow House, Amir Shah Talash, has created a Pashto-language TV series.  During the same period Gittoes was making a feature documentary, Love City Jalalabad, featuring key members of the Yellow House.  The producer was Piraya Film, Stavanger, Norway.  While documenting the difficulties of filming, especially with female actresses, in Afghanistan, the film articulates a positive message, that film-making and cultural production generally can be an alternative to armed force in bringing about social change.  The film previewed at Documenta 13 in Kassel, Germany, before being released in 2013.

In 2013 Gittoes suffered from serious health problems, having both surgery for prostate cancer and a double knee replacement.  He was also hospitalised with internal stomach bleeding.  Nevertheless, he took up a position as artist in residence in Syracuse, New York, where he developed and produced the synthages referred to above, as a new means of working through his experiences at Kibeho nearly 20 years before.  In 2014, undeterred by health problems, he returned to Jalalabad to begin work on his next film, Snow Monkey, for which he received funding from Film Australia.  He returned to Sydney in early 2015 and Snow Monkey premiered at the Melbourne International Film Festival in August 2015.  With its searching portrayal of the lives of young people in Jalalabad, Snow Monkey won the Audience Award at the Biografilm Festival in Bologna, Italy, in June 2016.

Recent work, 2016–2020

In 2016, Gittoes published an anecdotal autobiography, Blood Mystic, combining reproductions of works with reminiscences spanning the whole of his life.  He continued to paint, and in 2017 painted two portraits of Julian Assange in the Ecuadorean Embassy in London, and a series of “black paintings” done in Jalalabad.

At the start of 2018 Gittoes began work on a new, even more ambitious film, White Light, a documentary filmed on the south side of Chicago, co-produced with partner Hellen Rose who is also the Music Director.  With 500 fatal shootings a year in Chicago, and violent gangs controlling micro-territories, Gittoes found himself in as lawless and dangerous a place as any he had experienced.  Gaining the trust of gang members, he was able to weave gun protests and the 50th anniversary of the assassination of Martin Luther King into his story. White Light aired on ABC on July 14, 2020, and is still showing on ABC iView.

Meanwhile, a new direction for Gittoes has been making Virtual Reality (VR) films, using a 360-degree camera, embracing the artistic possibilities of new technology in a way that harks back to his early work with holograms.  The VR films have been made in collaboration with partner Hellen Rose and with long-time assistant and righthand frontline camera man, Pakistani Waqar Alam.  The first, Fun Fair Jalalabad, was shown in 2017, a second, Bring in the Clowns, a satiric drama attacking opponents of gun control in the US, in 2018.

This period saw two large scale art works created in South Side Chicago, 'Kill Kulture Amerika' and 'Renaissance Park' acquired by the Peabody Essex Museum Salem, Massachusetts.

February 2020 Newcastle  Art Gallery, Premiered the National Regional Touring Exhibition 'On Being There' curated by Rod Pattenden. Focussing on the broader work done in communities like Afghanistan and South Side Chicago. This period also saw the theatrical release of White Light in Event Cinema's.

During the Covid lockdown Gittoes created the Augustus Tower Suite reflecting his early Kennedy Suite of etchings created in the U.S. in 1968. "This is a time when the bad guys have won." Gittoes describes today's era comparing it with a time when US President John F Kennedy and Dr Martin Luther King were assassinated.

October 7–11, 2020, Gittoes and Rose collaborated on a site specific exhibition, installation and performance. Gittoes exhibited The Augustus Tower Suite in the 'Surf Shack Show' in a soon to be demolished house next door to his and Rose's residence. The ageing house once inhabited by good friends and professional surfers was demolished to make way for a new home by the owners. The owners of the property willingly helped facilitate the show. Gittoes hung the entire Augustus Tower Suite in the house and Rose used the grounds to perform the accompanying Haunted Burqa performance and the back yard shed as an installation and experimental documentary film screening of the same title. Representing the faceless countless innocent victims of Gittoes' portrayed 'bad guys'.

Motivation
Gittoes has travelled to many places for his art, including: Nicaragua, the Philippines, Somalia, Sinai, Southern Lebanon, Israel, Gaza, Western Sahara, Cambodia, Laos, Mozambique, South Africa, Congo, Rwanda, Yemen, Bosnia, Northern Ireland, Russia, Europe, UK, Bougainville, China, Taiwan, Tibet, Timor, Iraq, Pakistan and Afghanistan. He often travels to countries experiencing conflict and social upheaval, and uses these experiences extensively in his art.  He has highlighted important issues, such as that of landmines.  His travels have taken him to many dangerous places; he has been in serious danger on numerous occasions.  He has faced traumatic events, such as Kibeho, a subject with which he is still working two decades later.  He has explained the choice to work like this:

Or, to put it more simply, “The whole world is my studio.”

Honours
Gittoes' service to Australia has been recognised by the award of Member of the Order of Australia (1997) "for service to art and international relations as an artist and photographer portraying the effects on the environment of war, international disasters and heavy industry".

He was also awarded the Centenary Medal (2001) "for service as an internationally renowned artist". He was given an honorary Doctorate in Letters by the University of New South Wales in 2009.

A comprehensive public solo exhibition of his work, Witness to War, appeared at the Station Museum of Contemporary Art, Houston, Texas, in April 2011.

Gittoes and Rose received the NSW Premiers Award in 2014 jointly for their Services to the Community, recognising the couples co founding of the Yellow House Jalalabad in Afghanistan and the Rockdale Yellow House in Arncliffe, New South Wales.

Gittoes is twice the recipient of the Bassel Shehadeh Award for Social Justice (awarded at Syracuse University, New York, in October 2013 for Snow Monkey and in 2019 for White Light)

Gittoes received the prestigious Sydney Peace Prize (November 2015).

In 2020 Gittoes received honorary membership to the Australian Peacekeeper and Peacemaker Veterans' Association Inc. (For dedicated and selfless acts to chronicle Australia's Peacekeeping operations, and for his support and recognition of that community in Australia).

Filmography

Tracks of the Rainbow (1982, director and cinematographer)
Las balas de las poetas (1987, director and producer)
Soundtrack to War (2005, director and cinematographer)
Rampage (2006, director)
The Miscreants of Taliwood (2009, director and writer)
Love City, Jalalabad (2013, director and writer)
Snow Monkey (2015, director and writer)
White Light (2019, director, producer, screenwriter, cinematographer)

See also
Art of Australia
 Noel Counihan
 Yellow House Artist Collective

References

External links

 
 
The Miscreants – Film Review and Video Trailer
NZ Herald interview with Gittoes
Lifelounge magazine interview with Gittoes
Brooklyn Rail In Conversation George Gittoes
Pacifica Radio interview with George Gittoes on Art, Media and War

Living people
Australian war artists
People from the Sutherland Shire
1949 births
Australian filmmakers
Australian digital artists
Wynne Prize winners
Australian photographers
Blake Prize for Religious Art winners
Members of the Order of Australia